Song Ha-jin (born 29 April 1952) is a South Korean politician who served as the governor of North Jeolla Province from 2014 to 2022.

References

External links
 Song Ha-jin's Blog

1952 births
Living people
Minjoo Party of Korea politicians
People from Gimje
People from North Jeolla Province
Governors of North Jeolla Province